Odiabidi is a town located in Ahoada East Local Government Area of Rivers State, Nigeria. The postal code of Odiabidi is 510101.

Notable events
 2011: Singer and actress Muma Gee married her actor husband Prince Eke in a traditional wedding held in Odiabidi.

References

Towns in Rivers State